Spatial Concept (Italian - Concetto Spaziale) is a c.1965 painting by the Argentine-Italian painter Lucio Fontana. It is now in the Royal Museum of Fine Arts, Antwerp.

The painting was featured in the 1980 BBC television series 100 Great Paintings.

References

Paintings in the collection of the Royal Museum of Fine Arts Antwerp
1965 paintings